

Thomas-Emil von Wickede (23 April 1893 – 23 June 1944) was a German general in the Wehrmacht of Nazi Germany during World War II who commanded the X Army Corps. He was a recipient of the Knight's Cross of the Iron Cross. Wickede was killed on 23 June 1944, when an aircraft carrying him and generals Karl Eglseer, Eduard Dietl and Franz Rossi crashed in the vicinity of the small village of Rettenegg, Styria.

Awards

 Knight's Cross of the Iron Cross on 15 August 1940 as Oberstleutnant and commander of Infanterie-Regiment 4

References

Citations

Bibliography

 

1893 births
1944 deaths
People from Verden an der Aller
People from the Province of Hanover
German Army personnel of World War I
Recipients of the Knight's Cross of the Iron Cross
Victims of aviation accidents or incidents in Austria
Generals of Infantry (Wehrmacht)
Reichswehr personnel
Recipients of the clasp to the Iron Cross, 1st class
Military personnel from Lower Saxony
German Army generals of World War II